Heterobranchus is a genus of airbreathing catfishes native to Africa. However, H. palaeindicus, the only known extinct species of the genus, was discovered in the Siwalik Hills, India, dating to the Lower Pliocene.

Species
This genus contains four recent and two fossil species:

Recent species 
Heterobranchus bidorsalis É. Geoffroy Saint-Hilaire, 1809 (African Catfish)
Heterobranchus boulengeri (Pellegrin, 1922)
Heterobranchus isopterus (Bleeker, 1863)  —found in West Africa—
Heterobranchus longifilis Valenciennes, 1840 (Vundu; Sampa)

Fossil species 
 †Heterobranchus austriacus (Thenius, 1952)
 †Heterobranchus palaeindicus (Lydekker, 1886)

References

Clariidae
Catfish genera
Freshwater fish genera
Taxa named by Étienne Geoffroy Saint-Hilaire